Elizabeth Smith may refer to:

Politicians
Elizabeth Andrews (1882–1960), née Smith, Welsh Labour Party politician, writer, and suffragist
Elizabeth Rudel Smith (1911–1997), Treasurer of the United States
Elizabeth Joan Smith (1928–2016), Canadian politician
Liz Smith (politician) (born 1960), Scottish Conservative Party politician

Writers
Elizabeth Smith (translator) (1776–1806), English oriental scholar and translator
Elizabeth Smith (diarist) (1797–1885), British diarist
Elizabeth Oakes Smith (1806–1893), American poet, fiction writer, and women's rights activist
Betty Smith (1896–1972), American author
Liz Smith (journalist) (1923–2017), American gossip columnist
Elizabeth A. T. Smith (born 1958), American art historian

Mormons
Elizabeth Ann Whitney (1800–1882), née Smith, Latter Day Saint leader
Elizabeth Davis (Mormon) (1805–1844), wife of Joseph Smith Jr.

Other
Bessie Smith (1894–1937), American blues singer
Madge Smith (1898–1974), Canadian photographer
Liz Smith (actress) (1921–2016), English actress
Elizabeth Smith, Baroness Smith of Gilmorehill (born 1940), British peer and patron of the arts
Elizabeth W. Smith born 1952/3), finance executive
Elizabeth Jane Smith (engineer) (1889–?), first woman to study engineering at a Scottish university
Betty Smith (musician) (1926–2011), English saxophonist and singer
Betty Smith (American Dad!)
Elizabeth "Libby" Smith, a character on Lost
Elizabeth Smith (swimmer) (born 1996), American Paralympic swimmer

See also  
Betty Smith (disambiguation)
Liz Smith (disambiguation)
 List of people with surname Smith